Los Molinos may refer to:

Places

Spain 
Los Molinos, Madrid, a municipality in Community of Madrid
Los Molinos (Arén), in Huesca Province
Los Molinos de Sipán, a locality in the municipality of Loporzano, Huesca Province
Los Molinos (Sobrarbe), a locality in the municipality of El Pueyo de Araguás, Huesca Province
Los Molinos, Lanzarote, a village in the Canary Islands
Calzada de los Molinos, a municipality in the province of Palencia, Castile and León

Elsewhere 
Los Molinos, La Rioja, a municipality in La Rioja Province, Argentina
Los Molinos Dam, dam over the course of the Los Molinos River in the province of Córdoba, Argentina
Los Molinos, California, a census-designed place (CDP) in Tehama County, California
Los Molinos, Chile, coastal village and harbour near Valdivia, Chile
San José de los Molinos District, district of the province Ica, Peru
Rancho Rio de los Molinos, a 22,172-acre (89.73 km2) Mexican land grant in present-day Tehama County, California

Other uses 
10476 Los Molinos, an asteroid
Los Molinos CF, a football club in Spain
Los Molinos Observatory, in Uruguay

See also
El Molino (disambiguation)
Molinos (disambiguation)